Accelerators and Lasers In Combined Experiments (ALICE), or Energy Recovery Linac Prototype (ERLP) is a 35MeV energy recovery linac test facility at Daresbury Laboratory in Cheshire, England. The project was originally conceived as a test bed for the 4th Generation Light Source (4GLS), and consists of:
 A 350keV photoinjector laser.
 An 8.35MeV superconducting RF booster linac.
 A 35MeV superconducting RF main linac in which energy is recovered from used electron bunches and given to new bunches.
 An infrared free electron laser (FEL), using a permanent magnet undulator on permanent loan from Thomas Jefferson National Accelerator Facility (TJNAF).
 An ERL transport system that transports electron bunches through the FEL and back to the linac with the correct RF phase to decelerate them and thereby to recover energy from them.

The ALICE accelerator is an Energy Recovery Linac (ERL) that incorporates all the features of the 4th generation light source albeit at smaller scale. An ERL is not restricted by the dynamic properties of storage rings and, therefore, can attain an unprecedented electron beam brightness limited only by the electron gun. Energy recovery allows also a significant increase in an average power of the light sources (without building a dedicated power station nearby!).

The ability to produce ultra-short electron bunches well below 1ps and an availability of several light sources of different “colour” open up numerous possibilities for conducting investigations of fast processes on a femtosecond scale in molecular and solid state physics to name but a few.

The ALICE project was extended by addition of a 19-cavity accelerating Non-Scaling FFAG ring, known as the EMMA project. Construction of the EMMA machine began in September 2009. As of March 31, 2011, full ring circumnavigation was completed to establish proof of principle.

Principle 
A DC photoelectron gun generates short low emittance electron bunches with the length of several picosecond (ps) and accelerates them to a modest 350keV. The nominal bunch charge on ALICE is 80 picocoulomb (pC). The bunches are produced in trains lasting from ~10ns to 100ms and the train repetition frequency can vary from 1 to 20 Hz. Within the train, the bunches are separated by 12.3ns that corresponds to the laser pulse repetition frequency of 81.25 MHz.

The electron beam is then injected into the superconductive linac (booster), accelerated to the energy of 8.35MeV and transported to the main linac that increases the beam energy to 35MeV. Both superconductive linacs are cooled down to approximately 20 K with liquid helium. The accelerating phase of the main linac is chosen such  that a specific energy chirp is introduced along the bunch so that it can be later compressed longitudinally in a magnetic chicane (bunch compressor). The beam reaches the chicane after being turned by 180° in the first triple bend achromat ARC1.

After compression, the beam, consisting now of sub-picosecond bunches, enters the magnetic undulator that constitutes a major part of the mid-IR Free Electron Laser (FEL). This laser generates IR light with the wavelength of ~5mm.

The spent electron beam is returned to the entrance of the main linac via the second ARC2 at a precise time when the RF phase is exactly opposite to the initial accelerating phase. This condition requires an accurate adjustment of the electron beam path length that is accomplished by moving the ARC1 as a whole. The beam is now decelerated thus giving its energy back to the electromagnetic field inside the linac RF cavities (energy recovery) and emerges from the linac having the original energy of 8.35MeV. This energy recovered beam is diverted to the beam dump ending its short but useful life

Main parameters

See also
 EMMA

External links
 ERLP
 ASTeC project page
 Science and Technology Facilities Council 
 

Particle accelerators
Research institutes in Cheshire
Science and Technology Facilities Council